Mili Hadžiabdić (born 25 August 1963) is a former football defender from Bosnia and Herzegovina. His brother is Džemal Hadžiabdić.

He has played in the German lower leagues. He finished his career in 2007.

References

External links
 
 Mili Hadžiabdić at Zerodic statistics

1963 births
Living people
Sportspeople from Mostar
Association football defenders
Yugoslav footballers
Bosnia and Herzegovina footballers
FK Velež Mostar players
HNK Hajduk Split players
TuRU Düsseldorf players
Yugoslav First League players
Bosnia and Herzegovina expatriate footballers
Expatriate footballers in Germany
Bosnia and Herzegovina expatriate sportspeople in Germany